The Carnation Kid is a 1929 American drama film directed by E. Mason Hopper and Leslie Pearce and written by Alfred A. Cohn, Arthur Huffsmith and Henry McCarty. The film stars Douglas MacLean, Frances Lee, William B. Davidson, Lorraine MacLean, Charles Hill Mailes, and Francis McDonald. The film was released on March 2, 1929, by Paramount Pictures.

Cast 
Douglas MacLean as Clarence Kendall
Frances Lee as Doris Whitely
William B. Davidson as Blythe
Lorraine MacLean as Lucille
Charles Hill Mailes as Crawford Whitely
Francis McDonald as The Carnation Kid
Maurice Black as Tony
Ben Swor Jr. as Blinkey
Carl Stockdale as Deacon

References

External links 
 

1929 films
1920s English-language films
American drama films
1929 drama films
Paramount Pictures films
Films directed by E. Mason Hopper
American black-and-white films
1920s American films